Hoard of the Dragon Queen is an adventure module for the 5th edition of the Dungeons & Dragons fantasy role-playing game. It is the first part of the Tyranny of Dragons storyline and followed by a second adventure, The Rise of Tiamat.

Plot summary
Hoard of the Dragon Queen and a second adventure, The Rise of Tiamat, pits players against Tiamat.

Publication history
Hoard of the Dragon Queen was released on August 14, 2014 as part of the fantasy storyline called "Tyranny of Dragons", which launched alongside the new edition and is told through game supplements, video games, and other outlets. The first three chapters were also released as part of a free D&D Encounters kit for the D&D Adventurers League, the official organized play program by Wizards of the Coast.

The adventure was created by Kobold Press under commission from Wizards of the Coast.

Tyranny of Dragons (rerelease) 
During San Diego Comic-Con 2019, Wizards of the Coast announced on their Twitch stream that a new edition of Tyranny of Dragons was scheduled to be released on October 22, 2019. This new edition repackages Hoard of the Dragon Queen and The Rise of Tiamat together as a single volume. It also includes a full errata, a reworked opening chapter, and new cover art from artist Hydro74. It was only available from local game and hobby stores. James Whitbrook, for Io9, reports that "the re-release incorporates player feedback from the first two releases to smooth out the progressive curve of the quests presented in Hoard of the Dragon Queen and The Rise of Tiamat, which will encompass all the tweaks and addendums made to how D&D fifth edition plays in the five years gamers have had their hands on it. As an included bonus, the book will also include extra resources for players and dungeon masters that were only previously available online, as well as a treasure trove of behind-the-scenes concept art made for the adventure that rivals even Tiamat’s most desirable loot".

Tyranny of Dragons is scheduled to be rereleased in January 2023 with new cover art that features Tiamat.

Reception
Jonathan Bolding, for The Escapist, wrote that "structurally, it's a solid premise and interesting, but in play and as written the middle sections really tend to lag and create dragging, boring play where dungeon masters have to narrate hours of travel and punctuate when something 'interesting' happens. Even if your group are the types to go out of their way to familiarize themselves with the plethora of interesting NPCs that the adventure includes as part of their caravan north, only a bare handful of those NPCs actually matter outside their adventure segment".

AV Club'''s Samantha Nelson wrote that "the game does a great job at creating urgency. You can rest and heal, but doing so comes at the cost of one of the possible quests and the experience points you would gain for completing it. But players who want to do everything are setting themselves up for failure. One quest actually leads you into an ambush by cultists looking to stop your party’s meddling. If you don’t see it coming, you’re in for a really hard fight. The adventure also makes the bold decision of starting your heroes off as losers".Bleeding Cool's Gavin Sheehan wrote that "the rewards are minimal, especially in the experience department for the first few episodes. It’s enough to get by but not enough to make the characters super powerful moving forward. Normally I would say this is a nice balance of power and experience, but doing the math on a fresh character sheet, it feels like you’re always on the cusp of being great when you truly need to be great. [...] The story itself truly picks up when you hit Castle Naerytar, which is much further down the road after you’ve figured out who you are and what works best for your character, and hopefully have reached Level 5 in grand fashion".DieHard GameFan said that "overall, Horde for the Dragon Queen is a great co-release to go with the Player’s Handbook. The adventures are fun, they are well written and well balanced, and with eight different episodes in this campaign, you’re really getting a fantastic deal for your [money]."

Reviews
 Casus Belli (v4, Issue 13 - Jan/Feb 2015)

References

 External links 

 D&D Tyranny of Dragons — storyline trailer by Wizards of the Coast (via YouTube)
Wizards of the Coast product page (via the Wayback Machine)
 Online supplement for running this adventure without the Monster Manual or Dungeon Master's Guide'' 
 Hoard of the Dragon Queen Errata

Dungeons & Dragons modules
Forgotten Realms adventures
Role-playing game supplements introduced in 2014